Phelps Baptist Church is a historic Baptist church located at Phelps in Ontario County, New York, USA. The church was constructed in 1845 and is an example of Greek Revival style, cobblestone ecclesiastical architecture. It is a rectangular, gable roofed building built primarily of lake washed cobbles.  It is among the approximately 101 cobblestone buildings in Ontario County and 26 in the village and town of Phelps.

It was listed on the National Register of Historic Places in 1992.

References

Churches on the National Register of Historic Places in New York (state)
Greek Revival church buildings in New York (state)
Cobblestone architecture
Churches completed in 1845
19th-century Baptist churches in the United States
Phelps, New York
Churches in Ontario County, New York
National Register of Historic Places in Ontario County, New York